Gary Maclean is a Scottish chef, author and the first National Chef of Scotland.

Early life 
Gary Maclean grew up in Knightswood, Glasgow and was educated at Knightswood Secondary School, where he first developed an interest in cooking through his school's home economics course. Maclean continued his culinary education at the Glasgow College of Food Technology, which has since merged with several other institutions and is now known as the City of Glasgow College.

Career 
Maclean began his career at the age of 15, finding his first employment in hotel kitchens in the 1980s. He was appointed the head chef of 55BC, a Glasgow restaurant, at the age of 22. This was his first head chef position. He later became executive chef of Glasgow Museums, this post gave him responsibility over the restaurants at the Burrell Collection and the Gallery of Modern Art, Glasgow. Maclean began full-time teaching at the City of Glasgow College in 2010, he had previously spent 13 years working at the college in a part-time capacity.

Maclean successfully auditioned to appear on 2016's edition of MasterChef: The Professionals, this was his third attempt at applying for the show. After competing against 47 other professional chefs over 7 weeks of competition, Maclean was declared the winner in the final episode of season 9.

The Scottish Government announced, in November 2017, that Maclean was to become Scotland's first National Chef. This role includes promoting Scottish produce on the world stage and encouraging the domestic consumption of healthy, locally produced food.

Maclean released his first book, Kitchen Essentials: The Joy of Home Cooking, in October 2018. It features a foreword by Marcus Wareing, a Michelin-starred chef and one of the judges on MasterChef: The Professionals.  His second book, Gary Maclean's Scottish Kitchen, was released in April 2022. It features a foreword by Sam Heughan, the star of Outlander. Both of Maclean's books were published by Black & White Publishing.

Maclean co-presented BBC Scotland's Corner Shop Cook-Off alongside Clare Grogan. During each episode, Maclean would compete with another chef to determine who could cook the best three course meal using only produce from a local corner shop. The six episode series originally aired from 19 February to 25 March 2020.   

Maclean opened his own seafood restaurant, called Creel Caught, in 2021. It is located in the Bonnie & Wild Scottish Marketplace in the St James Quarter, Edinburgh. Maclean opened a Scottish deli, named Soup & Caboodle, at the same venue in 2023. In 2023, Maclean opened another restaurant, called Scottish Kitchen by Gary Maclean, in the Eastgate Shopping Centre, Inverness.

Awards 
Maclean won the Craft Guild of Chefs' chef lecturer award in 2015.

Maclean received the Hospitality Educator of the Year Award at the 2017 CIS Excellence Awards.

Maclean was inducted into the College Development Network's College Hall of Fame in November 2019.

Maclean was awarded the Mark Twain Award by the Saint Andrew's Society of the State of New York, in November 2021, for 'his contributions to the global Scottish community'. The award was bestowed at the Society's 265th annual banquet, held in the University Club of New York

Published works

References

External links 

Living people
Scottish television chefs
Reality cooking competition winners
People from Glasgow
1972 births
People educated at Knightswood Secondary School